Let It Be Known is a seven track EP by American rapper Spice 1. It peaked at number 69 on the Billboard Top R&B/Hip-Hop Albums. The album was produced entirely by Ant Banks.

Track listing
"Ghetto Thang"
"Let It Be Known"
"187 Proof (Part 1)"
"1-900-S.P.I.C.E."
"In My Neighborhood"
"Break Yourself" (featuring MC Ant)
"City Streets"

Chart history

References

External links 
 Let It Be Known at Discogs
 Let It Be Known at MusicBrainz

1991 EPs
Albums produced by Ant Banks
Spice 1 EPs